Purathcikkaaran is a 2000 Tamil-language drama film directed by Velu Prabhakaran and scripted by P. Jayadevi. The film stars the director himself in the lead role with Sathyaraj,  Raadhika, Arun Pandian, Khushbu and Roja in other pivotal roles. The film, which had musical score by Vidyasagar, was released in 2000.

Plot synopsis
Thamizhmani, a non-believer in god, kidnaps three different heads of religion. During an interview at his hideout, he relates to Kanimozhi, a journalist, as to how a Brahmin turned into a terrorist.

Cast
Velu Prabhakaran as Thamizhmani/Ramanujam
Sathyaraj as Anna
Arun Pandian
Mansoor Ali Khan
Khushbu
Roja as Kanimozhi
Neena
Manivannan
Radharavi
Senthil
Janagaraj
Mohan Raman
Raadhika in a cameo appearance

Production
The film was launched at a ceremony in February 1998, with Kamal Haasan attending as the chief guest.

Release
The film struggled to find distributors, owing to its atheist theme and received a limited release across cinemas. A critic compared it to the several devotional movies releasing in Tamil Nadu during the period calling it "more mature and better presented" but that "the extremity of the propaganda puts one off". The critic praised Velu Prabhakaran's efforts noting that the maker "believes in his convictions and the dialogs sizzle with intelligence."

Soundtrack

The film score and the soundtrack were composed by Vidyasagar. The soundtrack, released in 2000, features 5 tracks with lyrics written by Vairamuthu and Bharathidasan.

References

External links
 

2000 films
2000s Tamil-language films
Films scored by Vidyasagar
Films directed by Velu Prabhakaran